The World Wars is a three-part, six-hour event miniseries by the History Channel that premiered on Monday, May 26, 2014, (Memorial Day) airing for three consecutive nights. An extended version of the series, divided into six episodes with never before seen footage, was subsequently broadcast on H2 and in more than 160 countries on June 22, 2014.

Narrated by Jeremy Renner, the documentary series features a mix of dramatic reenactments, archival stills and footage, and interviews with historians and authors alongside current and former prominent political figures such as former U.S. Senator John McCain from Arizona, former U.S. General and Secretary of State Colin Powell, former British prime minister John Major, former Italian Prime Minister Mario Monti, former U.S. Defense Secretary Leon Panetta, former U.K. Foreign Secretary David Miliband and many more.

The show was produced for History Channel by Stephen David Entertainment, the production company behind the Emmy Award-winning miniseries The Men Who Built America. A portion of the filming took place in and around Martinsburg, West Virginia in the United States during October and November 2013. The series was introduced by United States President Barack Obama in a pre-recorded message.

Plot
According to the History Channel, the miniseries "showcase(s) the thirty year period that changed the course of human history", documenting both World Wars and the interwar era in a continuous timeline from 1914 to 1945. The series takes a personality-driven approach, focusing on some of the key players of World War II (Hitler, Mussolini, Patton, Stalin, Churchill, Roosevelt), and chronicling how their experiences as younger men in the First World War shaped them into the leaders they became in World War II.

Tagline:

Cast
The series features two actors for each of the main characters, one young (during WWI) and one older (during World War II and its lead-up).

 Winston Churchill – Ian Beyts
 Young Churchill – Tom Vickers
 Charles De Gaulle – Don Meehan
 Young De Gaulle – Michael Perrie
 Adolf Hitler – Hugh Scully
 Young Hitler – Maximilian Klas
 Douglas MacArthur – Dan Berkey
 Young MacArthur – Prescott Hathaway

 Benito Mussolini – Jonathan Hartman
 Young Mussolini – Nabil Vinas
 George S. Patton – Don Hartman
 Young Patton – Matt Dearman
 Franklin Delano Roosevelt – Dino Gigaliano
 Young Roosevelt – Kevin McKillip
 Joseph Stalin – Joseph Scott Barbarino
 Young Stalin – Jacopo Rampini

 Hideki Tojo – Isao Ota
 Young Tojo – Koji Oshashi
 Vladimir Lenin – C. Conrad Cady
 Bernard Montgomery – Joe Bevilacqua
 Harry S. Truman – David Mitchum Brown
 Woodrow Wilson – Judd Bankert
 George Marshall – Sewell Whitney

Interview subjects
The following people appear as talking head experts throughout the series.

Politicians/Military Figures: 
 Dick Cheney
 Joe Lieberman
 John Major
 John McCain
 Stanley McChrystal
 Mario Monti
 David Miliband
 Richard Myers
 Leon Panetta
 Colin Powell
 Donald Rumsfeld

Historians/Authors: 
 Michael Beschloss
 Richard Bosworth
 H. W. Brands
 Douglas Brinkley
 Johann Chapoutot
 Richard Connaughton
 Richard Evans
 Robert Gellately
 Steven Gillon
 Max Hastings
 Sönke Neitzel
 Paul Reid
 Ron Rosenbaum
 Adam Tooze

Episodes

Expanded version
During the expanded re-airings during June, instead of three episodes, the series was split into six episodes.

"Trial by Fire" and "Never Surrender", episodes 1 and 5 of the expanded six-part series, use the same names as episodes 1 and 3 of the original three part series with two hour episodes.

Home media release
On September 9, 2014, the miniseries was released on DVD and Blu-ray Disc formats. The two-disc includes English subtitles and bonus material, such as deleted scenes of over an hour of footage cut from the original U.S. broadcast; "Characters In Depth" of Churchill, Stalin, Truman, Roosevelt, Eisenhower, and Hitler; and 10 featurettes on both wars. UltraViolet digital copies of each episode were also included.

References

External links

2010s American drama television miniseries
2014 American television series debuts
2014 American television series endings
History (American TV channel) original programming
Documentary television series about World War I
Documentary television series about World War II